The Irish Chess Championship is the national Championship of Ireland, currently run by the Irish Chess Union (ICU), the FIDE-recognised governing body for the game. Below is the list of champions. The first champion was J.A. Porterfield Rynd, who won the Dublin Chess Congress 1865 No. 3 Tournament, reserved for "amateurs, bona fide resident in Ireland for the 12 months prior to 1st September 1865".

The Irish Chess Association was founded in 1885. Its congresses of 1886 and 1889 included provision for determining the Irish Championship, and the winners were Richard Whieldon Barnett (later Sir Richard Barnett) and George D. Soffe, respectively.

The Hibernian Chess Association was established during the 1891-92 season, and held one Irish championship, in 1892, which was won by J.A. Porterfield Rynd.

Since its foundation in 1912 the Irish Chess Union has organised the Irish Chess Championships. The events ran sporadically at first, but have been held annually since 1924, except for suspension during 1941-45.

The Irish Chess Championship has run in various formats including a round robin competition, a match system, and a Swiss system competition. Since 2013, the championship has been organised as a 9-round Swiss event, open to players registered as IRL with FIDE, who meet a rating requirement.

Irish Champions

Irish Women's Champions

1953 	Hilda F. Chater
1954 	Hilda F. Chater
1955 	Hilda F. Chater / Kay Doolan
1957 	Hilda F. Chater
1968 	Dorren O'Siochrú
1969 	Catherine Byrne
1970 	Elizabeth O'Shaughnessy
1971 	Aileen Noonan / Cecile Meulien
1972 	Dorren O'Siochrú
1973 	Dorren O'Siochrú
1976 	Dorren O'Siochrú
1977 	Ann Teresa Delaney
1980 	Suzanne Connolly / Ann Teresa Delaney
1982 	Edel Quinn
2010   April Cronin
2012 	Karina Kruk
2013 	Diana Mirza
2014   Gearoidín Uí Laighleis
2015   Monika Gedvilaite
2016   Monika Gedvilaite
2017   Ioana Miller
2018   Ioana Miller
2019   Ioana Miller
2021   Alice O'Gorman
2022   Trisha Kanyamarala

Senior / Veteran winners
1999  	Andrew Thomson
2000  	Jack Parker
2001  	Andrew Thomson, Maurice Coveney
2002 	Pat Loughrey, Maurice Coveney
2003 	Maurice Coveney
2004 	No information found
2005  	Pat Loughrey
2006 	Paul Cassidy, Colm Egan
2007 	Paul Cassidy, Jack Killane
2008 	Jack Killane, Paul Cassidy
2009 	Paul Cassidy
2010 	Colm Egan, Art Coldrick, Melvyn King
2011 	Jack Killane
2012 	Paul Cassidy
2013 	Eamon Keogh / Jack Killane
2014 	Pat Twomey / John Nicholson
2015 	Tim Harding
2016 	Eamon Keogh
2017
2018

Irish Under-19 Champion
1949   Michael Fagan
1951   Sam Ferris
1954   Richard Grogan
1957   John McMahon
1958   Harry Harte
1959   Art Coldrick (O'Connells / Phibsboro)
1965   Anthony Cafferky
1966   John Moles
1967   John L. Moles
1968   Paul Henry
1969   David Wilson
1970   Bernard Kernan
1971   Bernard Kernan
1972   Rod Nixon & Colm Quigley
1973   Rod Nixon
1974   Paul Delaney
1976   Colm Barry
1977   David Dunne
1978   Keith Allen
1979   Keith Allen, John Delaney, Sean Coffey
1980   Keith Allen & John Kennedy
1983   Eddie Grant (Phibsboro)
1984   Killian Hynes
1990   Richard McMaster (Fisherwick)
1997   Eoin Spring
1998   Adam Kelly (Sam Collins finished ahead but declared Under 16 champion)
1999   Sam Collins (Gonzaga)
2000   John Kennedy
2001   John Kennedy
2002   Stephen Stokes (Alex Lopez finished ahead but declared Under 16 champion)
2003   Alex Lopez
2004   Alex Lopez
2005   Matthew Dignam
2006   Karl McPhillips
2007   Jan Mueller
2008   Dara Murphy (Ryan-Rhys Griffiths finished ahead but declared Under 16 champion)
2009   Sam Osborne (St. Benildus)
2010   Ryan-Rhys Griffiths
2013   Hugh Doyle (Cork)
2014   Ben Cullen (Gonzaga) 
2015   Tom O'Gorman (Dun Laoghaire)
2016   Conor O'Donnell (Gonzaga)
2017   Denis Ruchko (Ballinasloe)
2018   Peter Carroll (Gonzaga)
2019   Jacob Flynn (Malahide)
2021   Oisin O Cuilleanain

External links
Irish Championships at the website of the Irish Chess Union
includes history, scores, crosstables, bios, and interviews.

Notes 

Chess national championships
Women's chess national championships
Chess in Ireland
1865 establishments in Ireland
Articles containing video clips
Chess